Earl Thorfinn may refer to:

 Thorfinn Turf-Einarsson, Earl of Orkney (Thorfinn Skullsplitter)
 Thorfinn Sigurdsson, Earl of Orkney (Thorfinn the Mighty)
 MV Earl Thorfinn, a 1990 ferry in the Orkney Ferries fleet

See also 
 Thorfinn (disambiguation)